Cylichnium is a genus of very small sea snails, unassigned in a family in the order Cephalaspidea (bubble snails).

Species
 Cylichnium africanum (Locard, 1897)
 Cylichnium ancillarioides (Schepman, 1913)
 Cylichnium chinense (G.-Y. Lin & W.-L. Wu, 1994)
 Cylichnium cylindrellum (Dall, 1908)
 Cylichnium domitum (Dall, 1908) 
 Cylichnium guineense Thiele, 1925 
 Cylichnium jucundum Thiele, 1925
 Cylichnium mucronatum Valdés, 2008
 Cylichnium nanum Valdés, 2008 
 Cylichnium oliviforme (R. B. Watson, 1883) 
 Cylichnium spatha (R. B. Watson, 1883)
 Cylichnium waldae Bouchet, 1975 
Species brought into synonymy
 Cylichnium matsumotoi Habe, 1955: synonym of Cylichnium ancillarioides (Schepman, 1913)
 Cylichnium sumatrense Thiele, 1925: synonym of Cylichnium ancillarioides (Schepman, 1913)

References

 Valdés, Á. (2008). Deep-sea "cephalaspidean" heterobranchs (Gastropoda) from the tropical southwest Pacific. In: Héros, V. et al. (eds) Tropical Deep-Sea Benthos 25. Mémoires du Muséum national d'Histoire naturelle. 196: 587-792

External links
  Serge GOFAS, Ángel A. LUQUE, Joan Daniel OLIVER,José TEMPLADO & Alberto SERRA (2021) - The Mollusca of Galicia Bank (NE Atlantic Ocean); European Journal of Taxonomy 785: 1–114

Cephalaspidea